Daly is a small lunar impact crater that is located in the eastern part of the Moon, to the northwest of the crater Apollonius. This formation is relatively circular, with a slight inward bulge along the northern rim. The inner wall is wider in the southern half than in the north. The crater intrudes into the comparably sized crater Apollonius F to the east-southeast.

The crater is named after Reginald Aldworth Daly. It was previously designated Apollonius P.

References

External links

 LTO-62D2 Daly — L&PI topographic map

Impact craters on the Moon